Don Gillmor is a Canadian journalist, novelist, historian and writer of children's books., and is the recipient of many awards for this journalism and fiction.

Gillmor's writing has appeared in Saturday Night, The Globe and Mail, The Toronto Star, Rolling Stone, GQ, National Geographic, Toronto Life and The Walrus, where he worked as senior editor. He also served on the faculty of the Literary Journalism Program at the Banff Centre.

Gillmor's magazine writing has earned him three gold and seven silver Canadian National Magazine Awards, and he has been called "one of Canada’s most celebrated profile writers". In 2014, he won a National Newspaper Award for an article on baby boomers and suicide.

Gillmor is the author of three works of fiction: Kanata (2009), a Canadian historical epic, Mount Pleasant (2013), a comic novel about debt and Long Change (2015), which explores the life of an oilman (Gillmor worked on an oil rig in the late 1970s). He's also written five books of non-fiction, including the two-volume work Canada: A People's History, which accompanied the award-winning television program of the same name, and won the 2001 Libris Award for non-fiction book of the year. Among his nine children's books are Yuck, A Love Story (2000), which won the 2000 Governor General's Award for Children's Literature, and The Fabulous Song (1996), which won the Mr. Christie Book Award.

Gillmor graduated from the University of Calgary with a B.A. in 1977. He currently resides in Toronto.

In 2019 he won the Governor General's Award for English-language non-fiction for his book To the River: Losing My Brother.

Bibliography

Non-fiction
 Canada: A People’s History, Volume I (2000)
 Canada: A People’s History, Volume II  (2001)
 The Desire of Every Living Thing (2000)
 Insight and On Site: The Work of Diamond + Schmitt (2008)
 Stratford Behind the Scenes (2012)
 To the River (2018)

Fiction
 Kanata (2009)
 Mount Pleasant (2013)
 Long Change (2015)

Children's Books
 The Trouble with Justin (1993)
 When Vegetables Go Bad (1994)
 The Fabulous Song (1995)
 The Christmas Orange (1998)
 Yuck, A Love Story (2000)
 Sophie and the Sea Monster (2005)
 The Boy Who Ate the World (2008)
 The Time Time Stopped (2011)

References

External links
Don Gillmor official website

21st-century Canadian novelists
20th-century Canadian novelists
Governor General's Award-winning children's writers
Canadian children's writers
Canadian historical novelists
Canadian male journalists
Canadian male novelists
Journalists from Toronto
Writers from Toronto
Living people
University of Calgary alumni
20th-century Canadian male writers
21st-century Canadian male writers
Governor General's Award-winning non-fiction writers
Year of birth missing (living people)